The 1947–48 Minneapolis Lakers season was the inaugural season for the Lakers. The Lakers won the National Basketball League championship against the Rochester Royals. George Mikan led the team with 21.3 points per game and was the league's MVP. After the season, both the Lakers and Royals would leave the NBL to join the Basketball Association of America (BAA) along with two other NBL clubs, the Fort Wayne Zollner Pistons and the Indianapolis Kautskys.

Regular season

Western Division standings

Playoffs
 Won NBL NBL Championship (3-1) over Rochester Royals
 Won NBL Western Division Semifinals (2-0) over Tri-Cities Blackhawks
 Won NBL Western Division Opening Round (3-1) over Oshkosh All-Stars

Awards and records
 George Mikan, MVP, All-NBL First Team
 Jim Pollard, All-NBL First Team

References

Los Angeles Lakers seasons
Minneapolis
National Basketball League (United States) championship seasons
Minnesota Lakers
Minnesota Lakers